The Municipal District of Peace No. 135 is a municipal district (MD) in northwestern Alberta, Canada. Located in Census Division No. 19, its municipal office is located outside but adjacent to the Village of Berwyn.

Geography

Communities and localities 
 
The following urban municipalities are surrounded by the MD of Peace No. 135.
Cities
none
Towns
Grimshaw
Villages
Berwyn (location of municipal office)
Summer villages
none

The following hamlets are located within the MD of Peace No. 135.
Hamlets
Brownvale

The following localities are located within the MD of Peace No. 135.
Localities 
Early Gardens
Griffin Creek
Last Lake
Peace River Correctional Institution
Rocky Ridge Estates
Roma
Roma Junction
Shaftesbury Settlement (designated place) or Shaftsbury Settlement

Demographics 

In the 2016 Census of Population conducted by Statistics Canada, the MD of Peace No. 135 had a population of 1,747 living in 578 of its 639 total private dwellings, a  change from its 2011 population of 1,446.

Economy 
Agriculture is a significant part of the area's economy, with the region being dubbed as most northern agricultural industry oasis in the world. The region has unique growing combination of a northern climate, fertile soils, and a watershed system fed by glacial run offs.

Attractions 
Lac Cardinal Recreation Area
Queen Elizabeth Provincial Park
Strong Creek Park
Wilderness Park

See also 
List of communities in Alberta
List of municipal districts in Alberta

References

External links 

 
Peace